Ketterson is a surname. Notable people with the surname include:

Ellen Ketterson, American biologist
Mark Thomas Ketterson (born 1954), American performing arts critic and writer